Munmun is an Indian given name.

Notable people with this name include:
 Munmun Ahmed (born 1966), Bangladeshi actress and dancer
 Munmun (actress), Bangladeshi film actress
 Munmun Dutta (born 1987), Indian actress
 Munmun Lugun (born 1993), Indian footballer
Munmun may also refer to:

 Munmun, a 2018 young adult novel by Jesse Andrews.

References